Gary Goodner (born 8 December 1949) is a Puerto Rican former swimmer who competed in the 1968 Summer Olympics.

References

1950 births
Living people
Puerto Rican male swimmers
Puerto Rican male freestyle swimmers
Olympic swimmers of Puerto Rico
Swimmers at the 1968 Summer Olympics
Pan American Games competitors for Puerto Rico
Swimmers at the 1971 Pan American Games
Central American and Caribbean Games gold medalists for Puerto Rico
Competitors at the 1966 Central American and Caribbean Games
Competitors at the 1970 Central American and Caribbean Games
Central American and Caribbean Games medalists in swimming